Strikes is the third studio album by the American Southern rock band Blackfoot. It was released on March 7, 1979 through Atco Records. Recording sessions took place at Subterranean Studios in Ann Arbor, at Sound Suite Studios in Detroit, and at Bee Jay Studios in Orlando. Production was handled by Henry Weck and Al Nalli.

The album debuted at number 183 on the Billboard 200 and later reached number 42. On April 18, 1986, it received a Platinum certification status by the Recording Industry Association of America.

It features two singles: "Highway Song", which reached number 26 on the Billboard Hot 100, and "Train, Train", which reached number 38. "Train, Train" was originally recorded in 1971 by Rick Medlocke's grandfather Shorty Medlocke and his daughter, as Shorty Medlock & Mickey with the Fla. Plow Hands, and was the B-side of their "If I Could Live It Over (I’d Be a Different Guy)" single. The song was covered by country singer Dolly Parton on her 1999 album The Grass Is Blue, and by metal band Warrant on their 1990 album Cherry Pie. The song appeared in the 2011 film Straw Dogs.

Track listing

Personnel 
Band members
 Rickey Medlocke – lead vocals, guitar
 Charlie Hargrett – guitar
 Greg T. Walker – bass, backing vocals
 Jakson Spires – drums, backing vocals

Additional personnel
 Pat McCaffrey – keyboards
 Shorty Medlocke – harmonica (track 8 – prelude)
 Michael "Cub" Koda – harmonica (track 8)
 Donna D. Davis – backing vocals
 Pamela T. Vincent – backing vocals
 Cynthia M. Douglas – backing vocals
 Henry "H-Bomb" Weck – percussion, recording engineer, producer
 Al Nalli – producer

Charts

Certifications

References

External links 

1979 albums
Atco Records albums
Blackfoot (band) albums